Knobview Township is an inactive township in Crawford County, in the U.S. state of Missouri.

Knobview Township took its name from the community of Rosati, Missouri, formerly called Knobview.

It has a population of 1,813, and its residents tend to be politically conservative.

References

Townships in Missouri
Townships in Crawford County, Missouri